In the U.S. State of Kansas, wind power is the largest source of electricity, generating over 41% of the state's electricity in 2019. Kansas has a high potential capacity for wind power, second behind Texas. The most recent estimates (2012) are that Kansas has a potential for 952 GW of wind power capacity yet had only about 5.6 GW installed by year end 2018. Kansas could generate 3,102 TW·h of electricity each year, which represents over 75% of all the electricity generated in the United States in 2011. This electricity could be worth $290 billion per year (at 9.35 cents per kW·h).

Growth 

Kansas has led the nation over the past decade in all measured categories of scaling up renewable electricity generation with an overall growth in generation of 1,678.5% from 2001-2007. This rapid overall growth in renewable energy generation represents an equally large increase of 1,487.9%, as a percent of total state electricity generation. Massive increases in generation are largely the product of wind energy development across the state. In 2001, Kansas had 114 Megawatts (MW) of wind energy generation. By the end of 2011, Kansas had installed 1,224 MW of generation. Wind energy generation in Kansas grew 2,793.5% from 2001-2007. This amounts to an average growth of slightly over 75% per year.

Potential 
Being centrally located in the midwest, Kansas is squarely placed in the center of America’s wind tunnel, a corridor stretching from North Dakota south into the Texas panhandle, where the vast majority of the nation’s best on-shore wind resources are located. Kansas has the 2nd highest wind potential in the U.S. with an estimated over 952,000 MW possible capacity, capable of generating over 3,101,576 GWh. Texas has the largest wind potential.

With a projected total state peak load of 10,000 MW, Kansas could become a major wind energy exporting state to the south and the east U.S. where renewable generation opportunities are much more constrained.

The Department of Energy’s National Renewable Energy Lab (NREL) projects that if Kansas were to develop 7,158 MW of new wind by 2030 the economic impact for Kansas would total over $7.8 billion in benefit to local economies, landowners, and job creation, creating over 26,000 new jobs.

In 2007 Kansas Governor Sebelius noted in her State of the State address that “our goal is to produce 10 percent of our state’s electricity from wind power by 2010, and 20 percent by 2020.”

Wind power accounted for 19.4% of the electricity generated in Kansas during 2013.   
By 2016 it accounted for 29.6%.
In 2018 it reached 36%, a higher percentage than any other U.S. state. In 2019 it comprised 41.45%.

Economic benefits 
Forecasts indicate that for every 1,000 MW of wind developed in Kansas, cumulative economic benefits will be $1.08 billion, with annual CO2 reduction estimated at 3.2 million tons, and annual water savings at 1,816 million gallons. These projected benefits could be greatly increased by developing more localized manufacturing, installation, supply and maintenance industry within the State. In the 6 years leading up to 2008, Kansas lost 10,944 manufacturing jobs totaling 6% of the manufacturing workforce. It is estimated that the potential manufacturing benefit for Kansas lies mostly in the southeastern part of the state. Up to 2008, southeastern Kansas experienced the majority of high unemployment rates in the state (i.e., >6%).

Environmental impact

Education 
Cloud County Community College has a wind energy technology program in Concordia. CCCC is the only college in the state of Kansas with an AWEA-certified wind energy program and only one of seven in the entire United States. They are located just two miles north of the Meridian Way wind farm.

Wind generation

Source:

See also

Solar power in Kansas
Wind power in the United States
List of wind farms in the United States
List of HVDC projects

References

External links

 Kansas Energy Office